J.A. Adande (born October 25, 1970) is an American sportswriter, commentator and educator, who currently serves as the Director of Sports Journalism at Northwestern University.

Career
Adande began his career as a sports columnist for the Los Angeles Times.

Adande joined ESPN.com as an NBA columnist in August 2007. The panel at Around the Horn all congratulated him on the job and played a joke "Buy or Sell" segment about Adande's comments about joining ESPN. He was an NBA analyst on SportsCenter.

He was a regular panelist on ESPN's Around The Horn, starting in 2007, and after a period away, returned as a panelist in January 2018. He was formerly an American sports columnist and sideline reporter who covered the National Basketball Association for ESPN, and was also a regular guest host on ESPN's Pardon the Interruption television shows. Adande is a member of the National Association of Black Journalists, and also served as an adjunct professor at the University of Southern California's Annenberg School of Journalism.

Adande announced via Twitter in August 2017 that he was relocating to Chicago and becoming director of the new sports journalism program at Northwestern University, as well as a faculty member of the Medill School of Journalism.

During his time at ESPN, Adande covered the Olympic Games, Wimbledon, the Super Bowl, the NCAA Final Four, and the NBA Finals.

Personal life
He was born  in Los Angeles, the son of Desire and Elizabeth (Oberstein) Adande. His grandfather, Gerson "Gus" Oberstein (1914-2003), was a violinist who had played with jazzmen Joe Roland and Charlie Parker, and later with the Berkeley Symphony.

Adande earned a BA in journalism from Medill School of Journalism at Northwestern University in 1992. He was sports editor of The Daily Northwestern, the student newspaper.

References

External links
 J.A. Adande's Around the Horn biography
 J.A. Adande's Los Angeles Times biography
 J.A. Adande's final LA Times column.
 

1970 births
Living people
University of Southern California staff
Medill School of Journalism alumni
Los Angeles Times people
Crossroads School alumni
Sportswriters from California